Koroush Maleki (born May 9, 1991) is an Iranian footballer who plays as a goalkeeper for Saipa in the Persian Gulf Pro League.

References

Living people
1991 births
Association football goalkeepers
Iranian footballers
Sanat Mes Kerman F.C. players
Mes Rafsanjan players
Gostaresh Foulad F.C. players
Sepidrood Rasht players